Hometime can refer to:

 Hometime (U.S. TV series), the long-running PBS home improvement television show
 Home Time, BBC2 2009 sitcom
 Hometime (single), a single by indie rock group One Eskimo
 Hometime (album), the album by British singer Alison Moyet
 Hometime (band), a Christian metalcore
 Geoff Lloyd's Hometime Show, a drivetime programme between 5PM and 8PM on Absolute Radio
 A slang term for prostitution